Two ships of the Japanese Navy have been named Yashiro:

 , a  launched in 1944 and ceded to China in 1947
 , a minesweeper launched in 1955 and struck in 1981

Japanese Navy ship names